The 2014 Summer Youth Olympics, officially known as the II Summer Youth Olympic Games , and commonly known as Nanjing 2014, were the second Summer Youth Olympic Games, an international sports, education and cultural festival for teenagers, held from 16 to 28 August 2014 in Nanjing, China. These were the first Youth Olympic Games held in China, making it the first country to host both regular and Youth Olympics following the 2008 Summer Olympics in Beijing.

Bidding process

The International Olympic Committee established the Youth Olympic Games in July 2007. The 2014 host city was elected on 10 February 2010, during the 2010 IOC Session in Vancouver.  This was the first election of a Youth Olympic Games host city held in an IOC Session. The elections for the host cities of the 2010 Summer Youth Olympics and 2012 Winter Youth Olympics were done through postal votes by IOC members.

April 2009 – NOCs to inform the IOC of the name of a YOG Candidate City.  (This was changed from February 2009 after several NOCs asked for more preparation time)
September 2009 – Submission of the YOG Candidature File, YOG Guarantees File, photographic files and Undertaking
December 2009 – Short-list of YOG Candidate Cities by the IOC Executive Board
February 2010 – Election and announcement of the Host City of the 2nd Summer Youth Olympic Games at the 122nd IOC Session in Vancouver (before the 2010 Winter Olympics)

Logo
Like other Olympic events, the 2014 Summer Youth Games has its own logo. 
The logo consists of three parts. The colorful "NANJING" reflects the image of the gate of Nanjing and the features of some Jiangnan houses. The various colors symbolize youths' energetic spirit.

Venues
All of the venues are located in four zones within Nanjing. All venues with the exception of the cycling road, sailing, and triathlon venues, were temporary.

The Nanjing Olympic Sports Center hosted the opening and closing ceremonies.

Torch relay

The Youth Olympic torch was designed by the Vatti Corporation Ltd. The torch is known as the "Gate of Happiness." A structure resembling a city gate is found on the top part of the torch and the blue color of the torch represents the peaceful tranquility of Nanjing. The Yangtze which flows next to Nanjing is presented as stripes found on the handle of the torch. It is said that the torch is capable of resisting wind speeds of 11 m/s, rainfall of 50mm/h, altitude of up to 4500m and a temperature range of -15˚C to 45˚C.

Following Olympic tradition the torch lighting ceremony was held on 30 April 2014 in Athens, Greece at the Panathenaic Stadium where the first Olympic Games were held. Four young athletes from Greece and China competed in a mini-relay.

The torch relay was divided into two parts. The first part was a digital relay where people who downloaded an app were able to participate in the relay through an interactive option called "Give Me Fire." When using this feature users were able to pass the Youth Olympic flame to their friends by touching their devices together. The relay visited 258 different online locations from the 204 participating NOCs over a 98-day period.

After the digital relay the relay began its physical portion in Nanjing where a 10-day relay was held. 104 torch bearers carried the torch singularly or in pairs over 100 legs. Torch bearers were primarily focused on youth and included individuals from sport, culture, media, volunteers and the International Olympic Committee. Notable torch bearers included two time badminton Olympian gold medalist Lin Dan, 2008 Olympic fencing gold medalist Zhong Man, director Chen Weiya and composer Bian Liunian.

Sports
222 events, there will be 13 mixed team events (Mixed-NOCs), 4 mixed team events (NOCs), 1 open event (Equestrian), 109 men's events, and 95 women's events. This is a tentative list of the sports program taken from the general presentation of the 2nd Summer Youth Olympic Games in 2014. Golf and Rugby sevens will be contested for the first time. Beach volleyball will replace indoor volleyball and other format changes to sports like field hockey which introduced a five a side format. New events have also been introduced in some of the sports including a shooting mixed gender event among others.

Demonstration sports
These were the demonstration sports in the games:

Medal table

The NYOGOC did not keep an official medal tally. The ranking in this table is based on information provided by the IOC and is consistent with IOC convention in its published medal tables. For the full medal table, refer to the main article.

Medals won by teams with athletes from more than one National Olympic Committee are included in the table as medals awarded to a mixed-NOCs team. There were eight events which composed entirely of mixed-NOCs teams, and as such all 25 medals in these events, including two bronzes in judo, were swept by mixed-NOCs teams. The remaining medals were won in events which combined mixed-NOCs teams and teams representing one NOC. The mixed-NOCs listing is not given a ranking.

Alongside the mixed-NOCs teams, the top ten ranked NOCs are listed below. China (highlighted), as host nation, is also included in the table.

Calendar
All dates are BJT (UTC+8)
222 events are expected to be held over the 2014 Youth Olympics. The schedule will be finalized as the event becomes closer.

Participating nations
203 out of the 204 National Olympic Committees recognized at that time sent delegates to Nanjing. Among them, both Sierra Leone and Nigeria were planning to participate, but on 13 August 2014 both nations pulled out due to pressure from Chinese Authorities in an attempt to prevent Ebola from West Africa from entering their nation. On 15 August 2014 Liberia also withdrew along with two athletes from Guinea being barred by the International Olympic Committee (IOC) due to fears that the nature of their sports (judo and swimming) could pose a risk to other athletes. An athlete from South Sudan competed under the Olympic flag as they did not have a National Olympic Committee. The ten nations with the most athletes are China (with 123), Brazil (with 97), United States (with 92), Australia (with 89), Russia (with 88), Germany (with 85), Egypt (with 83), France (with 82), Japan (with 78), and Mexico (with 78).

Cultural and education program
Youth Olympic Games incorporate a Cultural and Education Program, featuring a variety of cultural and educational activities for young people. Youth Olympics include educational experience based on Olympic values that promote healthy lifestyles and allow young athletes to become well-rounded people with "true sporting spirits." Well-known athletes and "international specialists" guide the young participants. The program combines "Olympic traditions (such as the torch relay) with diverse cultures to spread the Olympic spirit."

Athlete role models
On 17 March 2014 37 athletes from the 28 Olympic sports were chosen by the IOC to be role models at the 2014 Youth Olympics. The athletes will offer support, mentor and advice to the participating youth Olympians. As an athlete role model they will take part in activities and workshops on healthy lifestyles, social responsibility and Olympism. They will also take part in informal chats known as "chat with champions." On 9 April 2014 and 22 April 2014 footballer Simone Farina and swimmer Patrick Murphy were appointed as the 38th and 39th Athlete Role Model respectively.

  Khatuna Lorig competed for the Unified Team in 1992 and Georgia in 1996 and 2000.
  Heather Moyse competed in Bobsleigh at the 2006, 2010 and 2014 Winter Olympics.

Young ambassadors
A total of 104 people were selected by their National Olympic Committee to be young ambassadors. Young Ambassadors are aged between 18 and 25 and are athletes, coaches, students or young professionals that demonstrate the Olympic values and inspire and empower young people to do the same.

The main roles of the Young Ambassadors is to promote the Youth Olympics in their nations and to encourage athletes of their nations to get the most out of the Youth Olympic experience by encouraging them to interact with people from different sports and cultures and to take part in activities and workshops.

A seminar has held from 25 to 28 March 2014 in order to prepare the ambassadors for the Youth Olympics by teaching them about the cultures and activities Nanjing has to offer.

Controversies

Isolation of Nigerian athletes in the Games
Following the 2014 West Africa Ebola outbreak, Chinese officials quarantined and isolated all Nigerian athletes from all sporting facilities despite all testing negative to Ebola before the games. The Nigerian Olympic committee reacted to the discrimination by withdrawing all its athletes from the games.

Doping
One unnamed taekwondo athlete had been disqualified from competing at the Youth Olympics after testing positive for the banned diuretic furosemide. The information was released on 5 November 2014.

See also
Olympic Games celebrated in China
2008 Summer Olympics – Beijing, China
2022 Winter Olympics –  Beijing, China

Notes

References

External links

Nanjing 2014 official website 

 
Summer Youth Olympics
Olympic Games in China
Summer Youth Olympics
Summer Youth Olympics
Sport in Nanjing
Youth Olympic Games by year
Multi-sport events in China
Summer Youth Olympics
Summer Youth Olympics